The 1980 season was São Paulo's 51st season since club's existence.

Statistics

Scorers

Managers performance

Overall
{|class="wikitable"
|-
|Games played || 71 (44 Campeonato Paulista, 18 Campeonato Brasileiro, 9 Friendly match)
|-
|Games won || 34 (22 Campeonato Paulista, 8 Campeonato Brasileiro, 4 Friendly match)
|-
|Games drawn || 24 (13 Campeonato Paulista, 8 Campeonato Brasileiro, 3 Friendly match)
|-
|Games lost || 13 (9 Campeonato Paulista, 2 Campeonato Brasileiro, 2 Friendly match)
|-
|Goals scored || 106
|-
|Goals conceded || 63
|-
|Goal difference || +43
|-
|Best result || 4–0 (A) v Palmeiras - Friendly match - 1980.08.054–0 (H) v Corinthians - Campeonato Paulista - 1980.08.10
|-
|Worst result || 1–3 (H) v Internacional - Friendly match - 1980.02.131–3 (H) v Guarani - Campeonato Paulista - 1980.10.08
|-
|Top scorer || Serginho Chulapa (26)
|-

Friendlies

Official competitions

Campeonato Brasileiro

Record

Campeonato Paulista

Record

External links
official website 

Association football clubs 1980 season
1980
1980 in Brazilian football